Meir Rauch (15 October 1909 – 1 August 1983) chess master, born in Zolynia, Poland.

In August–September 1939, he played for the Palestinian team in the 8th Chess Olympiad on the first reserve board (won 4, lost 2 and drew 7) in Buenos Aires. When World War II broke out, Rauch, along with many other participants of that Olympiad, decided to stay permanently in Argentina.
He emigrated to Israel in 1945.

Around 1960 Rauch was still a member of the Réti chess club in Tel Aviv. He held the Israeli record for a blindfold simultaneous game (8 players).

References

External links

1909 births
20th-century Polish Jews
Polish chess players
Jewish chess players
Israeli chess players
Year of death missing
People from Łańcut County
Polish emigrants to Mandatory Palestine
Sportspeople from Podkarpackie Voivodeship